John Mylong (September 27, 1892 – September 8, 1975), also known as Jack Mylong-Münz, born Adolf Heinrich Münz, was an Austrian actor who later settled in the United States.

Selected filmography

 Der heilige Hass, 1. Teil (1921) - Rabob
 Der heilige Hass, 2. Teil - Die Flucht vor dem Tode (1921) - Rabob
 Die Schlucht des Grauens (1921)
 Die Satansfratze (1921)
 Die Nacht der tausend Seelen (1921)
 Das Wirtshaus im Spessart (1923)
 Die Bestie (1923)
 The Tragedy of a Night of Passion (1924)
 The Malay Junk (1924)
 The Terror of the Sea (1924)
 The Four Last Seconds of Quidam Uhl (1924) - Heinrich, Magdalensa Bruder
 Die Tragödie der Entehrten (1924)
 The Pearls of Doctor Talmadge (1925)
 A Song from Days of Youth (1925) - Jürg Asmussen
 Written in the Stars (1925) - Horst Raabe
 Mrs Worrington's Perfume (1925) - Dr. Harry Edwards
 The Adventurous Wedding (1925) - Fergus
 Venetian Lovers (1925) - Chevalier Tomasso
 Der Frauenmarder (1925)
 Your Desire Is Sin (1925) - Felix Dubois
 The Eleven Schill Officers (1926) - Freischärler 
 Vienna, How it Cries and Laughs (1926) - Martin - sein Sohn
 I Liked Kissing Women (1926) - Harald Brandt, Gutseleve
 Our Emden (1926)
 The Villa in Tiergarten Park (1927) - Rolf Sander
 The Catwalk (1927) - Felix, sein Sohn
 A Day of Roses in August (1927) - Werner Anrae, ein Maler
 The Convicted (1927)
 The Harbour Bride (1927)
 Grand Hotel (1927)
 Light Cavalry (1927) - Graf Komaroff
 The Eleven Devils (1927) - Biller, gegnerischer Mittelstürmer
 Wenn Menschen reif zur Liebe werden (1927) - Erster Arbeiter
 The False Prince (1927) - Fritz Stein - sein Freund
 Only a Viennese Woman Kisses Like That (1928) - Der 'schwarze Maxl'
 The Old Fritz (1928) - Minister Hagen
 Artists (1928) - his Assistant Kelly
 Who Invented Divorce? (1928)
 The Lady in Black (1928) - Werner Bennigsen
 Cry for Help (1928)
 Strauss Is Playing Today (1928) - Mödlinger
 Adam and Eve (1928) - Chauffeur
 Modern Pirates (1928) - Henry Lincoln, Filmschauspieler
 Mikosch Comes In (1928) - Wachtmeister Rott
 The Harbour Baron (1928) - Der 'Hafenbaron'
 The Secret Adversary (1929) - Boris
 Children of the Street (1929)
 The White Roses of Ravensberg (1929) - Andreas, der Gärtner
 The Merry Widower (1929) - Ein Paradegast
 Das verschwundene Testamant (1929) - von Malten
 The Favourite of Schonbrunn (1929) - Ordonnanz des Kaisers
 Jenny's Stroll Through Men (1929) - Mr. Dinessen
 Two Brothers (1929) - Michael, der Bruder
 Napoleon at Saint Helena (1929)
 Drei Tage auf Leben und Tod - aus dem Logbuch der U.C.1 (1929) - Der Koch
 Pancéřové auto (1930) - Bob Witt
 Das Erlebnis einer Nacht (1930)
 Tonka of the Gallows (1930) - Jan
 The Copper (1930) - Zahnstocher-Jeff (German Version)
 Bockbierfest (1930) - Raumert - Brauereibesitzer
 K. und K. Feldmarschall (1930) - Graf Geza von Medak
 Utrpení sedé sestry (1930) - Adolf
 Different Morals (1931) - Marx, Aushilfsdiener
 Mary (1931) - John Stuart
 Fra Diavolo (1931)
 When the Soldiers (1931) - Ein Rittmeister
 The Squeaker (1931) - Harry "Juwelen Harry" Webber 
 Peace of Mind (1931) - Arthur Dreyer, Student
 The Other Side (1931)
 The Paw (1931) - Rennfahrer Lopez
 The Duke of Reichstadt (1931) - Tiburce de Lorget
 Louise, Queen of Prussia (1931)
 Cadets (1931)
 Holzapfel Knows Everything (1932) - Fritz
 Cruiser Emden (1932) - Offizier der "Emden"
 Die elf Schill'schen Offiziere (1932)
 Kampf um Blond (1933) - Lipkowicz
 The Invisible Front (1933) - Rolf Lange
 The Hymn of Leuthen (1933) - Gen. Seydlitz
 The House of Dora Green (1933) - Pilarsky
 Invisible Opponent (1933)
 Adventures on the Lido (1933)
 Our Emperor (1933) - Royal consellor
 Um ein bisschen Glück (1933) - Fred - Cousin des Professors
 Sestra Angelika (1933)
 Bretter, die die Welt bedeuten (1935)
 Tagebuch der Geliebten (1935)
 Overture to Glory (1940) - Stanislaw Maniusko
 The Devil Pays Off (1941) - Von Eltzen (uncredited)
 Crossroads (1942) - Baron De Lorrain (uncredited)
 Chetniks! The Fighting Guerrillas (1943) - Commander (uncredited)
 The Moon Is Down (1943) - Staff Officer (uncredited)
 Crash Dive (1943) - Captain of Submarine (uncredited)
 They Came to Blow Up America (1943) - German Officer (uncredited)
 For Whom the Bell Tolls (1943) - Colonel Duval
 Hostages (1943) - Proskosch
 The Strange Death of Adolf Hitler (1943) - Gen. Halder
 Corvette K-225 (1943) - Submarine Commander (uncredited)
 The Hitler Gang (1944) - Doctor General (uncredited)
 The Story of Dr. Wassell (1944) - Joyful 'Janssen' Passenger (uncredited)
 Song of the Open Road (1944) - Jack & John Moran's Uncle (uncredited)
 The Mask of Dimitrios (1944) - Druhar (uncredited)
 The Master Race (1944) - Grunning (uncredited)
 The Conspirators (1944) - Prison Commandante (uncredited)
 Experiment Perilous (1944) - Nick Bedereaux Sr. (uncredited)
 Roughly Speaking (1945) - Polish Waiter (uncredited)
 The Clock (1945) - Aristocratic Restaurant Customer (uncredited)
 I'll Tell the World (1945) - Dr. Johnston (uncredited)
 The Falcon in San Francisco (1945) - Carl Dudley
 Lost City of the Jungle (1946, Serial) - Malborn
 The Searching Wind (1946) - Hotel Manager (uncredited)
 Monsieur Beaucaire (1946) - Minister of State (uncredited)
 Cloak and Dagger (1946) - German Captain (uncredited)
 I've Always Loved You (1946) - Impresario (uncredited)
 The Perils of Pauline (1947) - French Doctor (uncredited)
 Unconquered (1947) - Colonel Henry Bouquet
 The Girl from Jones Beach (1949) - Stravitch (uncredited)
 Battleground (1949) - German Major (uncredited)
 Oh, You Beautiful Doll (1949) - Toastmaster (uncredited)
 Young Daniel Boone (1950) - Col. von Arnheim
 Annie Get Your Gun (1950) - Kaiser Wilhelm II (uncredited)
 Vendetta (1950) - (uncredited)
 His Kind of Woman (1951) - Martin Krafft
 The House in Montevideo (1951) - Anwalt
 Sea Tiger (1952) - J.M. Hennick
 Robot Monster (1953) - The Professor
 Captain Scarface (1953) - Kroll
 Rhapsody (1954) - Doctor (uncredited)
 Magnificent Obsession (1954) - Dr. Hofer
 The Crooked Web (1955) - Herr Koenig
 Never Say Goodbye (1956) - Herr Gosting
 The Eddy Duchin Story (1956) - Mr. Duchin
 The Beast of Budapest (1958) - Gen. Foeldessy
 I Mobster (1959) - Papa Sante (uncredited)
 Mermaids of Tiburon (1962) - Ernst Steinhauer

References

External links
 
 
 
 

1892 births
1975 deaths
Austrian male film actors
Austrian male silent film actors
Austrian male television actors
American male television actors
American male film actors
Male actors from Vienna
20th-century American male actors
20th-century Austrian male actors
Austrian emigrants to the United States